Second Son or The Second Son may refer to:

Books
The Second Son, 1979 novel by Charles Sailor
Second Son, 1988 novel by Robert Ferro
Second Son (novel), 2011 novel by Lee Child
The Second Son, 2011 novel by Jonathan Rabb
The Second Son, 2000 novel by Joanna Wayne

Film and TV
The Second Son, a 1955 black-and-white Japanese film

Music
Second Son, 2001 album by Jim Hurst

Songs
"Second Son", song by Overkill from Feel the Fire
"Second Son", song by Cannonball Adderley and his Quintet, from Inside Straight
"Second Son", song by Glenn Hughes, from The Way It Is
"Second Son", song by Elliott Brood 
"The Second Son", song by Bill Dixon, from November 1981

See also
Infamous Second Son, video game